This is a list of cricketers who have played matches for Pakistan's Faisalabad cricket team in first-class, List A or Twenty20 cricket.

 Aaley Haider
 Aamer Nazir (cricketer, born 1966)
 Abdul Mannan (cricketer)
 Abdul Samad (Pakistani cricketer)
 Abdur Rauf (cricketer)
 Ahmed Hayat
 Ahmed Safi Abdullah
 Ahsan Raza
 Ali Rafiq
 Ali Raza (cricketer, born 1987)
 Ali Shan (cricketer)
 Ali Waqas
 Ameer Hamza (cricketer, born 1994)
 Ammar Mahmood
 Aqeel Ahmed (cricketer)
 Asad Ali
 Asad Raza (cricketer)
 Asad Zarar
 Asif Ali (cricketer, born 1991)
 Asif Hussain
 Atiq-ur-Rehman (Faisalabad cricketer)
 Bilal Haider
 Ehsan Adil
 Faheem Ashraf
 Hasan Mahmood
 Humayun Farkhan
 Ibtisam Sheikh
 Iftikhar Ahmed (Faisalabad cricketer)
 Ijaz Ahmed (cricketer, born 1969)
 Imran Ali (cricketer, born 1983)
 Imran Khalid
 Inzamam-ul-Haq
 Kamran Naeem
 Kashif Naved
 Masood Anwar
 Misbah-ul-Haq
 Mohammad Hafeez
 Mohammad Imran (cricketer, born 1996)
 Mohammad Laeeq
 Mohammad Nawaz (cricketer, born 1970)
 Mohammad Nawaz (cricketer, born 1974)
 Mohammad Ramzan (cricketer)
 Mohammad Salman (cricketer)
 Mohammad Sami (cricketer, born 1984)
 Mohammad Talha
 Mohammad Zahid (Faisalabad cricketer)
 Naseer Shaukat
 Naved Latif
 Raees Ahmed
 Saeed Ajmal
 Sajjad Akbar
 Samiullah Khan (cricketer)
 Shahid Nawaz
 Shahid Nazir
 Tauqeer Hussain
 Usman Arshad (Pakistani cricketer)
 Wasim Haider
 Zahid Ahmed (Pakistani cricketer)
 Zahoor Elahi
 Zahoor Khan
 Zeeshan Butt

References 

Lists of Pakistani cricketers